Mick Hennessy is a British boxing manager and promoter. He is the founder and CEO of Hennessy Sports. He was known for promoting Tyson Fury.

References

British boxing promoters
Living people
Year of birth missing (living people)
Place of birth missing (living people)